Against Me! is an American punk rock band.

Against Me! may also refer to their albums:

 Against Me! (demo), 1997
 Against Me! (2000 EP)
 Against Me! (2001 EP)